Bo Ingemar Erlandsson (16 November 1957 – 9 August 2022) was a Swedish footballer who played as a defender. He represented Malmö FF between 1976 and 1987. A full international between 1978 and 1985, he won 69 caps and scored two goals for the Sweden national team and represented his country at the 1978 FIFA World Cup.

Club career 
Erlandsson played for Malmö FF in Allsvenskan. He became Swedish champion with the club in 1977 and 1986, and was a part of the team in the European Champions Cup final in 1979 against Nottingham Forest.

International career 
He was a member of the Sweden national team, and was capped 69 times between 1978 and 1985. He was in the squad for the 1978 FIFA World Cup.

Post-playing career 
After retiring, he was a member of the board of directors of Malmö FF.

Death  
Erlandsson died on 9 August 2022, at the age of 64.

Career statistics 

Scores and results list Sweden's goal tally first, score column indicates score after each Erlandsson goal.

Honours 
Malmö FF

 Swedish Champion: 1977, 1986
 Svenska Cupen: 1977–78, 1979–80, 1983–84, 1985–86

References

External links

1957 births
2022 deaths
Swedish footballers
Footballers from Skåne County
Sweden international footballers
1978 FIFA World Cup players
Allsvenskan players
Malmö FF players
Association football defenders